The 2019 WPI Engineers football team represented Worcester Polytechnic Institute in the 2019 NCAA Division III football season. It marked the Engineers' 130th overall season.  The team played its home games at Alumni Stadium in Worcester, Massachusetts. They were led by tenth-year head coach Chris Robertson.

The Engineers finished the regular season with its fifth consecutive winning season, and the program's first ever season with ten wins.

Personnel

Coaching staff

Schedule
In 2019, WPI faced all seven NEWMAC opponents: Catholic, Coast Guard, Maine Maritime, MIT, Merchant Marine, Norwich, and Springfield. They also played four non-conference games: the three originally scheduled being Worcester State of the Massachusetts State Collegiate Athletic Conference (MASCAC), RPI of the Liberty League, and Husson of the Commonwealth Coast Conference (CCC), plus Western Connecticut State (MASCAC) in the New England Bowl series.

 On August 26, the Engineers tied for third in the 2019 NEWMAC Preseason Coaches' Poll.

Awards and honors

Weekly awards
NEWMAC Football Offensive Athlete of the Week
 Sean McAllen, RB – Week Ending September 22, 2019
 Connor Field, RB – Week Ending September 29, 2019
 Sean McAllen, RB – Week Ending October 6, 2019
 Julian Nyland, QB – Week Ending October 27, 2019

NEWMAC Football Defensive Athlete of the Week
 Zack Ahrens, DB – Week Ending September 15, 2019
 Nick Ostrowski, LB – Week Ending September 22, 2019
 Sam Casey, DB – Week Ending September 29, 2019

NEWMAC Football Special Teams Athlete of the Week
 Bryce Wade, K/P – Week Ending September 15, 2019
 Bryce Wade, K/P – Week Ending September 29, 2019
 Bryce Wade, K/P – Week Ending October 6, 2019
 Bryce Wade, K/P – Week Ending October 27, 2019

D3football.com Team of the Week
 Sam Casey, S – Week 4
 Isaac Patry, Peter Rakauskas, Vince Lucca, Jordan Hartley, & Sullivan Boyd, OL – Week 8

Postseason awards 
New England Football Writers Division II/III Coach of the Year
 Chris Robertson, HC
New England Football Writers Division II/III All‐New England Team
 Sean McAllen, RB
 Vince Lucca, OL
NEWMAC Offensive Athlete of the Year
 Sean McAllen, RB
NEWMAC Defensive Athlete of the Year
 Sam Casey, DB
NEWMAC All-Conference First Team
 Julian Nyland, QB
 Sean McAllen, RB
 Connor Field, RB
 Vince Lucca, OL
 Isaac Patry, OL
 Sam Casey, DB
 Nick Ostrowski, LB
 Lou Duh, DL
 Mike McGoff, DL
NEWMAC All Conference Second Team
 Nic Rossi, WR
 Peter Rakauskas, OL
 Jordan Hartley, OL
 Steve Mey, DB
 Adam Klosner, DB
 Zack Ahrens, LB
 Bryce Wade, P/K
 Austin Pesce, R
NEWMAC All-Sportsmanship Team
 Steve Mey, DBD3football.com All-East Region First Team Sean McAllen, RBD3football.com All-East Region Second Team Sam Casey, DBD3football.com All-East Region Third Team Nick Ostrowski, LBCoSIDA Academic All-American Football Second Team (DIII) Lou Duh, DLCoSIDA Academic All-District Football Team (DIII)'''
 Julian Nyland, QB
 Sean McAllen, RB
 Clark Ewen, WR
 Lou Duh, DL
 Nick Ostrowski, LB

References

WPI
WPI Engineers football seasons
WPI Engineers football